Herschel Englebert Lyons (July 23, 1915 – April 8, 2008) was an American right-handed pitcher in Major League Baseball who played one game for the St. Louis Cardinals in 1941.

Lyons was born in Fresno, California, and attended Occidental College.

Lyons played his only major league game with the Cardinals on April 17, 1941, as a reliever in a game against the Cincinnati Reds at Crosley Field. He allowed one hit and gave three walks while striking out one over 1 innings, and never appeared in a Major League game again. He did not have a decision and posted a perfect 0.00 earned run average.

Lyons was one of only three National League pitchers to steal a base in the 1941 season.

Lyons served in the Army Air Forces during World War II, with service in Italy and Africa. He later served as an elementary school principal in the Los Angeles Unified School District for over 25 years.

Lyons died in Inglewood, California, at the age of 92.

See also
St. Louis Cardinals all-time roster

References

External links

BaseballLibrary: 1941 St. Louis Cardinals

1915 births
2008 deaths
Major League Baseball pitchers
St. Louis Cardinals players
Baseball players from California
United States Army Air Forces personnel of World War II
Occidental Tigers baseball players
Sportspeople from Fresno, California
Asheville Tourists players
Columbus Red Birds players
Portsmouth Red Birds players
Rochester Red Wings players
Sacramento Solons players